The Russian National Public Library for Science and Technology, abbreviated GPNTB is a national library for engineering, science, and technology in Moscow, Russia. It was founded in 1958 on the basis of the State Science Library of the Ministry of Higher Education of the Soviet Union. It is located in Kharoshevskiy district of Moscow.

The mission of the library is to collect and store national and foreign science and technical literature, then disseminate information and bibliographical services for commercial, organisations and other institutions of the Russian Federation, development and application of up-to-date automated information technologies.

References

External links 
 

National libraries
Culture in Moscow
Buildings and structures built in the Soviet Union
Buildings and structures in Moscow
Education in Moscow
Libraries in Moscow
Education in the Soviet Union
1958 establishments in the Soviet Union
Science libraries
Libraries established in 1958